"Above and Beyond", also known as "Above and Beyond (The Call of Love)", is a song written by Harlan Howard and first recorded by American country music singer Wynn Stewart. Stewart's 1959 single release on the Jackpot label did not chart. In 1960, Buck Owens released his own rendition on Capitol Records with "'Til These Dreams Come True" on the B-side, reaching No. 3 on the Billboard country singles charts that year.

In 1989, Rodney Crowell recorded a cover version on his album Diamonds & Dirt. This cover, released with "She Loves the Jerk" on the B-side, charted at No. 1 on the country chart in late 1989. It was the fifth consecutive No. 1 hit from the album, as well as the fifth and final No. 1 of his career.

In 2017, the song was covered by Rhonda Vincent and Daryle Singletary for their duets album American Grandstand.

Chart performance

Buck Owens

Rodney Crowell

Year-end charts

References

1960 songs
1960 singles
1989 singles
Rodney Crowell songs
Buck Owens songs
Songs written by Harlan Howard
Song recordings produced by Tony Brown (record producer)
Capitol Records singles
Columbia Records singles
Song recordings produced by Ken Nelson (American record producer)
Song recordings produced by Rodney Crowell